Teatr Rozmaitości (Polish for "variety theatre") may refer to the following theatres in Poland:

Variety Theatre in Kraków
Variety Theatre in Radom, late 19th - early 20th centuries
Variety Theatre in Warsaw (since 1948)
Varsaw Variety Theatre (historical), late 19th - early 20th centuries